Anas Makhlouf (born on 12 June 1973) is a Syrian football coach and a former international forward.

References

1973 births
Sportspeople from Damascus
Living people
Syrian footballers
Syria youth international footballers
Syria international footballers
Association football forwards
Al-Majd players
PFC Krylia Sovetov Samara players
FC Shinnik Yaroslavl players
FC Rubin Kazan players
Syrian Premier League players
Russian Premier League players
Russian First League players
Syrian expatriate footballers
Expatriate footballers in Russia
Syrian expatriate sportspeople in Russia
Syrian football managers
Syria national football team managers
Al-Jaish Damascus managers
Sohar SC managers
Syrian expatriate football managers
Expatriate football managers in Oman
Syrian expatriate sportspeople in Oman